M-66 is a north–south state trunkline highway on the Lower Peninsula (LP) of the US state of Michigan. It runs from the Indiana state line in the south to Charlevoix in the north. M-66 is the only state highway to run the north–south distance of the LP. It starts as a continuation of State Road 9 (SR 9) which provides access to the Indiana Toll Road. A section of the highway immediately south of I-94 is an expressway, a type of divided limited-access highway, while the section along I-194 is a full freeway; otherwise M-66 is a two-lane rural highway. Two sections are listed on the National Highway System.

The first usage of the M-66 designation dates back to around July 1, 1919 with the rest of the original state highway system. At the time, the highway only extended between Lowell and Lakeview, a route now covered by M-91. The highway has been lengthened in a series of extensions north and south starting in 1925. A rerouting in 1944–45 removed M-66 from its original 1919 routing to replace another highway south of Six Lakes, the change that spawned M-91. The last big extension in 1965 resulted in the modern trans-peninsular highway route. The last modifications were shorter reroutings in the 1970s.

Route description
Most of the highway is two-lane undivided rural highway. There is a section south of Battle Creek that is a four-lane expressway. Running north into the Cereal City, M-66 is concurrent with I-194, which is a full freeway. This section along I-194 is listed on the National Highway System (NHS), a system of highways important to the nation's economy, defense, and mobility. Another section of M-66 is included on the NHS where it is concurrent with either M-72 or U.S. Highway 131 (US 131) in Kalkaska or Antrim counties.

Indiana to Ionia
M-66 is a four-lane highway that connects with State Road 9 (SR 9) at the Indiana state line in southern St. Joseph County. The highway runs north to Sturgis through farm land where it turns east through town running concurrently with US 12 on Chicago Road. As it leaves Sturgis to the north it crosses a branch of the Michigan Southern Railroad, and it becomes a two-lane surface highway along Nottawa Street. The highway runs near several small lakes and crosses the Nottawa Creek before meeting M-86. The two highways run north–south concurrently for about  along the Nottawa–Colon township line. Farther north, M-66 crosses the St. Joseph River and meets M-60. M-60/M-66 run together to the east, turning northeasterly in Leonidas running parallel to Nottawa Creek and crossing into the northwest corner of Branch County. M-60 and M-66 separate west of Union City, and M-66 turns north into Calhoun County.

Running through woodland terrain in southern Calhoun County, M-66 passes through Athens, along Graham Lake and continues to the outskirts of Battle Creek. The highway widens first to a four-lane, limited access expressway south of the Lakeview Square Mall before becoming a full freeway at the interchange with I-94. It is at the transition to freeway that M-66 starts its concurrency with I-194. I-194/M-66 is known as the Sojourner Truth Downtown Parkway, but the locals still use the former semi-official nickname, "The Penetrator". The southern section of the freeway has the highest traffic levels along M-66 as measured by average annual daily traffic (AADT) in the survey conducted in 2009. The Michigan Department of Transportation (MDOT) calculates the AADT value as a tally of the average number of vehicles using a given stretch of roadway. I-194/M-66 carried 25,200 vehicles on the average day during the year; 980  trucks were included in that traffic. I-194 ends, and M-66 continues northeast out of the Cereal City on Division Street and then northeast on Capital Avenue along the Battle Creek River.

M-66 continues northward through Barry County on Capital Avenue which becomes 9 Mile Road north of Baseline Road. The highway passes through Assyria before meeting M-79, with which it has a short concurrency, in Nashville. On the north side of the village, M-66 crosses the Thornapple River and continues north through mixed rural forest land and farm fields. Near Woodland, M-66 joins M-43 and the two run to the northeast and along the Barry–Eaton county line. M-43/M-66 meets M-50 at a four-way intersection southwest of Lake Odessa near Woodbury, and M-43 turns east leaving M-66 in favor of a concurrency with M-50. M-66 crosses a rail line of CSX Transportation and the county line on State Road. It meets I-96 in a rural southern part of the Ionia County south of Ionia. On the south edge of town, the highway passes the county airport and curves to the northeast becoming Dexter Street. While entering downtown Ionia, the trunkline crosses the Grand River and the abandoned mainline of the Grand Rapids Eastern Railroad near the county fairgrounds. M-66 turns west along M-21 (Lincoln Avenue) for two blocks before turning back to the north along State Street. The trunkline runs through the northern part of the county and meets M-44's eastern terminus near Woodard Lake.

Montcalm County and northward
In Montcalm County, M-66 intersects M-57 in a rural area south of Sheridan before running north on Sheridan Road through Stanton. The highway jogs west along Main Street in Stanton before returning to a northerly course on a discontinuous section of Sheridan Road. The roadway curves around the west end of Hemmingway Lake near Cannonsville Road. West of Edmore, M-66 turns northwesterly along M-46 on Edmore–Howard City Road to Six Lakes. M-66 separates there and returns to its northerly journey along Six Lakes Road between Little Bass Lake and First Lake. The road crosses into Mecosta County as 30th Avenue north of Six Lakes. The highway intersects M-20 at the intersection with 9 Mile Road in Remus. This area of rural Mecosta County is more heavily forested with rolling hills and sporadic farms. In Barryton, the roadway crosses the Chippewa River. M-66 continues north passing Merrill Lake before crossing into rural eastern Osceola County at Mesceola Road.

The highway meets US 10 near Sears after crossing the Pere Marquette State Trail. M-66 crosses the Muskegon River near a separate 9 Mile Road in Osceola County. It meets both M-115 and M-61 (16 Mile Road) south of Marion. The highway continues north and crosses the Great Lakes Central Railroad for the first time in Marion, before entering Missaukee County.  The trunkline then turns westward on Stoney Corners Road toward McBain through farm land. In town it runs along Maple Street and then runs north toward Lake City on Morey Road. South of the Lake City, M-55 runs concurrently with M-66 by Missaukee Golf Course and into town along the eastern shore of Lake Missaukee. North of town, M-55 splits off to the east on Houghton Lake Road, and M-66 continues north to an intersection with the eastern terminus of M-42 in a rural forest. M-66 leaves Morey Road and follows Pioneer Road to the county line.

As the highway crosses into Kalkaska County it crosses the Manistee River. M-66 runs through rolling hills in woodlands through the unincorporated farming community of Lodi north to an intersection with M-72. The two highways travel west together over the Great Lakes Central Railroad before turning north and merging with US 131 on a route parallel to the rail line. US 131/M-66/M-72 follows and crosses a branch of the Boardman River along Cedar Street through downtown Kalkaska. North of the central business district, M-72 separates to the west and US 131/M-66 crosses through the Pere Marquette State Forest on the way to Antrim and Mancelona in Antrim County. The highway follows Williams Street through the twin towns, meeting the southern terminus of  M-88 and western terminus of C-38 at the intersection with State Street in Mancelona. M-66 separates from US 131 and follows Mancelona–East Jordan Road out of town.

The section of M-66 north of the US 131 split had the highway's lowest AADT levels in the 2009 survey. MDOT reported that only 1,500 vehicles use this stretch of road in 2009. Of these vehicles, only were 140 trucks that used the segment of highway in 2009. The highway meanders through more forest lands through the community of Green River to East Jordan. M-66 follows Lake Street and turns to follow the western shore of the South Arm of Lake Charlevoix. The roadway turns inland through Ironton before returning to the lakeshore the rest of the way to Charlevoix. M-66 ends at an intersection with US 31 south of downtown next to Lake Michigan.

Services
MDOT provides a number of different services to motorists traveling along the state trunkline highway system. Along M-66, there are six different carpool lots located near Nashville, Woodland, Belding, Sheridan, Sears and Marion. There are additional services provided to travelers in the form of roadside parks and rest areas. There are two roadside parks along the highway, one is between Woodland and Woodbury, and the second is in Sheridan. The roadway also provides access to the Ionia State Recreation Area and a state harbor on Lake Charlevoix.

History

M-66 was first signed along a roadway by July 1, 1919 between M-16 (now M-21) at Lowell and M-46 near Lakeview. The designation was extended in 1925 along M-46 to Six Lakes and then north to M-13 (now US 131) in Lodi. A further extension north from Lodi in 1929 or 1930 along M-131 to Mancelona, a short segment of M-88 and north to US 31 in Charlevoix. The southern end was extended to US 16 south of Lowell by 1931. A section of the northern extension was marked on maps through 1933 as "under construction". That section was cancelled in favor of another routing near Mancelona. A short bypass of Six Lakes added about a mile to the length of the roadway in 1936. The M-131 concurrency was switched to a US 131 concurrency when the latter was extended in 1939. This concurrency was shortened just before World War II when the Michigan State Highway Department (MSHD) rerouted US 131 along a new road between South Boardman and Kalkaska.

The MSHD completed a major rerouting of M-66 around 1944–45. The M-14 designation of the time was decommissioned and replaced with M-66. Starting at Six Lakes, M-66 turned west along M-46 instead of east and then turned south through Stanton and Ionia ending north of Battle Creek. The highway between Lowell and Lakeview was redesignated as M-91. A minor realignment in late 1950 removed two 90° curves near the Osceola–Missaukee county line and replaced them with a pair of sweeping curves.

The MSHD rerouted M-66 between Maple Grove and Nashville in mid-1953. In the changes, M-79 was extended along the new route of M-66 and then over M-214 to Hastings. M-66 was shifted off Assyria Road which was turned back to local control. Another realignment in 1954 shifted M-66 to the modern routing between the M-43 concurrency termini, removing M-43/M-66 from a section of M-50 in the process. M-32 was extended along the northernmost section of M-66 in 1963.

M-66 was extended southerly from Assyria through Battle Creek to the Indiana state line replacing sections of M-78 in 1965. M-66 turned south and west along M-60 and new highway to Colon. The segment of former M-78 not used by M-66 was transferred to local control. The final section of M-78's roadway given to M-66 extended it all the way to the state line, resulting in a north–south trans-peninsular highway from Lake Michigan near Charlevoix to Indiana. M-66 is the only such highway to run the length of the Lower Peninsula. The extension allowed the Green Arrow Association to promote the whole length of the Green Arrow Route with a single highway number. The next year, M-66 was rerouted through Battle Creek to use the completed I-194 freeway.

A 90° turn in Missaukee County was removed north of Lake City in 1972. In late 1973 or early 1974, M-66 and M-72 were shifted around the south side of Kalkaska. Later in 1974, the M-32 concurrency was removed when M-32 was scaled back to its former terminus. A project in 1981 furthered the 1972 realignment in Missaukee County. About  were shortened from the routing when the new alignment was built between Smithville and Phelps Road.

Memorial designations
To capitalize on the opening of the Mackinac Bridge in 1957, local leaders in Battle Creek wanted to promote M-66 as a route north from Indiana to the bridge. They named the highway the Green Arrow Route as part of this marketing strategy. The color was to evoke the forests in the area, and arrow was meant to play on several historical connections. One of these was the Pennsylvania Railroad's Northern Arrow passenger train that once operated in the area. The official explanation was to tie into the history of Native Americans in the area, but the route was also "straight as an arrow". The backers also promoted the highway as a direct and scenic route to vacation country in the northern Lower Peninsula, avoiding most of the larger cities in the area.  M-66 was given the Green Arrow Route name in Public Act 170 of 1959 between the Indiana state line and Kalkaska. Despite these efforts, M-66 failed to attract much traffic. When the Michigan Legislature recodified the memorial highway names in Public Act 142 of 2001, the Green Arrow Route was truncated to the northern border of Calhoun County, a change confirmed by Public Act 138 of 2004.

Born Isabella Baumfree in 1797, Sojourner Truth settled in the Battle Creek area in the 1840s. She travelled through the Midwest and New England speaking against slavery and for women's rights. She lived in the area until her death in 1883. Her connection to the state of Michigan was honored by the state American Revolution Bicentennial Commission in 1976 which urged the Michigan Legislature to name a highway in her honor. Public Act 93 of 1976 named all of M-66 in Calhoun County, including the segment that runs concurrently with I-194, as the Sojourner Truth Memorial Highway. The highway was dedicated to her on May 21, 1976.

The Cereal City Development Corporation (CCDC) asked the Legislature to amend the memorial designation in 1993. They felt that I-194/M-66 was better known to locals as The Penetrator, and they wished to restore emphasis to Truth. They asked for the "Sojourner Truth Downtown Parkway" name to be applied to "M-66 between Interstate 94 and Hamblin". The Legislature passed Public Act 208 of 1993 to affect the change, restoring "the link between Sojourner Truth and the City of Battle Creek, which was once the center of abolitionist sentiment in the state."

Major intersections

See also

Notes

References

External links

 M-66 at Michigan Highways

066
Transportation in St. Joseph County, Michigan
Transportation in Branch County, Michigan
Transportation in Calhoun County, Michigan
Transportation in Barry County, Michigan
Transportation in Eaton County, Michigan
Transportation in Ionia County, Michigan
Transportation in Montcalm County, Michigan
Transportation in Mecosta County, Michigan
Transportation in Osceola County, Michigan
Transportation in Missaukee County, Michigan
Transportation in Kalkaska County, Michigan
Transportation in Antrim County, Michigan
Transportation in Charlevoix County, Michigan